Russ Hodges (born 19 July 1953) is  a former Australian rules footballer who played with South Melbourne and Fitzroy in the Victorian Football League (VFL). 		

Hodges also played VFA football for Sandringham and Kilsyth, serving as the inaugural captain-coach of the latter. In his time at Kilsyth in 1982, he jointly won the J. Field Medal as best and fairest in Division 2 (he originally finished runner-up on countback, but was later retrospectively made joint winner) and captained the Division 2 representative team.

Notes

External links 		
		
		
		
		
		
		
Living people		
1953 births		
		
Australian rules footballers from Victoria (Australia)		
Sydney Swans players		
Fitzroy Football Club players
Sandringham Football Club players